Svetlana Sergeevna Antonova (born December 10, 1979) is a Russian theater and film actress.

Early life 
She learned to swim at the age of 8 and is also interested in painting and photography.

She graduated from Boris Shchukin Theatre Institute.

Her elder sister is actress Natalia Antonova.

Career 
She worked in the Moscow Satire Theatre from 2001 to 2011.

Theatre Works 
 Apple thief as  Shura Drozd
 Secretaries  as mistress
 Eight Loving Women as Catherine
 Ornifl  as  Margarita
 The Mistress of the Inn as  Mirandolina
 No Сentimes Less! as  Vilda
 Schastlivtsev / Neschastlivtsev as fan girl
 Perfect Murder  as  Mary Selby, secretary

Filmography

References

External links 
 Official website 
 Svetlana Antonova at the kino-teatr.ru
   
  Svetaantonova.borda.ru 
  Svetlana Antonova of Maxim Magazine  

1979 births
Living people
Russian film actresses
Russian television actresses
Russian stage actresses
Actresses from Moscow
21st-century Russian actresses